Doris Haas (born 27 December 1964 in Gengenbach) is a German former archer.

Archery

Haas won a silver medal in the women's team event at the 1983 World Archery Championships and a bronze at the 1985 World Archery Championships representing West Germany.

At the 1984 Summer Olympic Games she came eleventh with 2480 points scored in the women's individual event. During the 1988 Summer Olympic Games she finished 32nd in the women's individual event and sixth in the women's team event.

References

External links 
 Profile on worldarchery.org

1964 births
Living people
German female archers
Olympic archers of West Germany
Archers at the 1984 Summer Olympics
Archers at the 1988 Summer Olympics
World Archery Championships medalists
People from Gengenbach
Sportspeople from Freiburg (region)
20th-century German women